Tuncay Karakaya (born October 1, 1989, in Korkut, Muş Province, Turkey) is a Turkish national goalball player of class B1 and Paralympian.

Sporting career
A member of Ankara Goalball Sports Club, Karakaya played in Turkey's national team at the 2012 Summer Paralympics, which became bronze medalist.

Achievements

References

Living people
1989 births
People from Korkut
Male goalball players
Turkish goalball players
Paralympic goalball players of Turkey
Goalball players at the 2012 Summer Paralympics
Visually impaired category Paralympic competitors
Turkish blind people
Paralympic bronze medalists for Turkey
Kurdish sportspeople
Medalists at the 2012 Summer Paralympics
Paralympic medalists in goalball
Goalball players at the 2016 Summer Paralympics
Goalball players at the 2020 Summer Paralympics
21st-century Turkish people